Osker was an American punk trio active in the late 1990s and early 2000s in the United States, based in Los Angeles, California. They were signed to Epitaph Records until their breakup in 2002.

Their debut album Treatment 5 was given a positive review of 3/5 by AllMusic, who wrote "Treatment 5, Osker's debut album, is a rather typical release for the Epitaph label -- aggressive punk with unhinged, snotty vocals and lyrics that alternate between goofy humor and angst-filled catharsis."

In 2001, the group released their second (and final) studio album, Idle Will Kill. During this year, the group also appeared in the movie Crazy/Beautiful, performing the songs "Fuck Me" and "Alright" from Treatment 5.

Band members
 Devon Williams
 David Benitez
 Phil Drazic

Discography

Studio albums
 Treatment 5 (2000) 
 Idle Will Kill (2001)

Split releases
 "Osker/Blindsided" (1998)

References

Punk rock groups from California
American musical trios
Musical groups from Los Angeles